New Caledonia is a French sui generis collectivity with a system of government based on parliamentarism and representative democracy. The President of the Government is the head of government, and there is a multi-party system, with Executive power being exercised by the government. Legislative power is vested in both the government and the Congress of New Caledonia. The judiciary is independent of the executive and the legislature.

Political developments 
Article 77 of the Constitution of France and the Organic Law 99-209 confers a unique status on New Caledonia between that of an independent country and a regular collectivité d'outre-mer or overseas collectivité of France. A territorial congress and government have been established, and the 1998 Nouméa Accord organized a devolution of powers. Key areas such as taxation, labor law, health and hygiene and foreign trade are already in the hands of the Congress. Further powers will supposedly be given to the Congress in the near future.

Under article 4 of the Organic Law 99-209 a New Caledonian citizenship has also been introduced: only New Caledonian citizens (defined by article 188) have the right to vote in the local elections. This measure has been criticized, because it creates a second-class status for French citizens living in New Caledonia who do not possess New Caledonian citizenship (because they settled in the territory only recently). New Caledonia is also allowed to engage in international cooperation with independent countries of the Pacific Ocean. Finally, the territorial Congress is allowed to pass statutes that are contrary to French law in a certain number of areas.

On the other hand, New Caledonia remains an integral part of the French Republic. Inhabitants of New Caledonia are French citizens and carry French passports. They take part in the legislative and presidential French elections. New Caledonia sends two representatives to the French National Assembly and two senators to the French Senate. The representative of the French central state in New Caledonia is the High Commissioner of the Republic (Haut-Commissaire de la République, locally known as "haussaire"), who is the head of civil services, and who sits in the government of the territory.

The Nouméa Accord stipulates that the Congress will have the right to call for a referendum on independence after 2014, at a time of its choosing. Following the timeline set by the Nouméa Accord, the groundwork was laid for a Referendum on full independence from France at a meeting chaired by the French Prime Minister Édouard Philippe on 2 November 2017, with the referendum to be held by November 2018. Voter list eligibility had been a subject of a long dispute, but the details were resolved at this meeting. In the 2018 referendum, voters narrowly chose to remain a part of France. Two further referendums were permitted, being held in 2020 and 2021. 2020 saw slimmer margins than in the 2018 referendum, with 46.74% in favor of independence, while the 2021 vote overwhelmingly rejected independence, with 96.49% against it.

The current president of the government elected by the Congress is Thierry Santa, from the loyalist (i.e. anti-independence) The Rally political party.

Executive branch

|High Commissioner
|Laurent Prévost
| 
|5 August 2019
|-
|President of the Government
|Thierry Santa
|The Rally
|6 July 2019
|}

The high commissioner is appointed by the French president on the advice of the French Ministry of Interior. The president of the government is elected by the members of the Territorial Congress.

Legislative branch
The Congress (Congrès) has 54 members, being the members of the three regional councils, all elected for a five-year term by proportional representation. Furthermore, there is a 16-member Kanak Customary Senate (two members from each of the eight customary aires).

Political parties and elections

Latest territorial election

Parliamentarians

French National Assembly
Philippe Dunoyer (first constituency, Caledonia Together, CE) elected 2017
Philippe Gomès (second constituency, Caledonia Together, CE) elected 2012

French Senate
Pierre Frogier (The Rally) elected 2011
Gérard Poadja (Caledonia Together, CE) elected 2017

Judicial branch
Court of Appeal or Cour d'Appel; County Courts; Joint Commerce Tribunal Court; Children's Court

Administrative divisions

New Caledonia is divided into three provinces: Province des Îles, Province Nord, and Province Sud - which are further subdivided into 33 communes.

International organization participation
French-Pacific Banking Agreement
International Confederation of Free Trade Unions
Pacific Islands Forum (associate)
 The Pacific Community (SPC)
United Nations Economic and Social Commission for Asia and the Pacific (associate)
World Federation of Trade Unions
World Meteorological Organization.

See also 

 Ouvéa cave hostage taking

References

External links

French
  French ministry of overseas territories